Long Road or The Long Road may refer to:

Film and television
The Long Road (film), a 1911 film by D. W. Griffith
"The Long Road" (Crusade), a television episode

Music
The Long Road, a 2003 album by Nickleback
Long Road, a 1991 album by Junior Reid
Long Road, a 1997 album by Quatermass II
"The Long Road", an instrumental by Mark Knopfler from Music from 'Cal', 1984
"The Long Road", a song by Passenger from Young as the Morning, Old as the Sea, 2016
"Long Road", a song by Pearl Jam from Merkin Ball, 1995
"Long Road", a song by W-inds, 2003

Other uses
Long Road (Sans Arc Lakota), a Sioux warrior memorialized at the Little Bighorn Battlefield National Monument
Long Road Sixth Form College, a school in Cambridge, England